T-Rex ApS is a manufacturer of handmade electric guitar effects pedals.



Company history

Based in the town of Vejle, Denmark, T-Rex Engineering was founded in 1996 by friends Lars Dahl-Jorgensen and Sebastian Jensen.

Their first product was the T-Rex BigFoot MIDI footboard, followed by the T-Rex Mac1 MIDI-to-analog controller.

The first line of guitar effects consisted of 4 pedals: the Alberta, Mudhoney, Comp-Nova and Tremster.  After these initial 4 pedals came the Replica delay pedal. Their sixth pedal was the BetaVibe chorus pedal. Released in 2003, the BetaVibe was ultimately discontinued.

Alongside its product development, T-Rex Engineering offers Scandinavian distribution of products for GeorgeL's (cables, plugs, and strings).

Amplifiers
In 2004, T-Rex introduced the BigTone series of guitar amplifiers. Handmade, like all their products, these amplifiers incorporated EL84 EH power tubes. The BigTone series consisted of 4 products: a 45 watt head, a 30 watt combo with 2x12 inch Alnico speakers, a 2x12 cabinet, and a 4x12 cabinet. The production of the BigTone series has since been terminated.

Effects pedals

Replica

Their most famous model in production, the Replica, is a digital delay pedal. The Replica is used by a number of popular artists, including David Gilmour, Pete Townshend, John Mayer, Steve Morse, Andrey Makarevich and was used by Gary Moore. It has been awarded Guitar Player magazine's Editor's Pick award.

The Replica provides up to 2000ms of digital delay at a 200 kHz sampling rate. Its controls consist of four knobs — Echo, Repeat, Level, and Tempo. It also has two footswitches — On/Off, and Tap Tempo; and two miniswitches — Brown, and Subdivision. It includes a "tap tempo" footswitch. The pedal can be made to mimick the sound of older delay equipment by engaging the Brown circuit, which enables a high-cut filter that muffles the sound.

Reptile 2

Reptile is a delay pedal and was introduced as a "baby brother" to the Replica. Its connectors and controls consist of input and output, one on/off footswitch, three knobs — Echo, Repeat, Level, and Time. The pedal also features a Flutter section with Tone, Speed, and Width controls, which mimics the vintage "warble" sound of tape-echo. In 2010, the original Reptile was upgraded to Reptile 2 with the addition of a Tap Tempo footswitch.

Comp-Nova

The Comp-Nova is a compressor. Its connectors and controls consist of input and output, one on/off footswitch, and three knobs — Comp., Level, and Attack.

Alberta

The Alberta is an overdrive/distortion pedal made to mimic the sound of the classic Ibanez TS-808 tube screamer pedal of the late 70s.

Tremster

The Tremster is a tremolo/vibrato pedal designed to mimic the sound of tremolos in vintage tube-driven guitar amplifiers. Its connectors and controls consist of input and output, one on/off footswitch, three knobs — Volume, Depth, and Speed, as well as one miniswitch — Mode.

Room-Mate

The Room-Mate is a tube-driven reverb pedal. It can both be used for guitars as well as line-level studio equipment. Its connectors and controls consist of mono input, stereo output, one on/off footswitch, three knobs — Mix, Level, and High Cut, and one rotary switch — Mode. The pedal features a window through which its 12AX7 tube can be seen, illuminated by a red LED.

Mudhoney & Mudhoney II

The Mudhoney is a distortion pedal that offers everything from mild distortions to all-out, extreme fuzz. Its connectors and controls consist of input and output, one on/off footswitch, three knobs — Gain, Level, and Tone, and a Boost button.

In 2010, T-Rex introduced the Mudhoney II, a twin-channel version of the Mudhoney. The Mudhoney II offers two separate channels of distortion, each with its own Boost and Tone Controls - allowing the player to easily switch between three distinct tones (Clean, Channel 1, and Channel 2).

Tonebug

The Tonebug Series is a growing line of pedals that strive to combine the T-Rex tone in the company's higher-end pedals with simpler controls at lower prices. The Series currently includes 10 pedals: Reverb, Overdrive, Distortion, Phaser, Chorus/Flanger, Sustainer, Fuzz, Booster, Sensewah and Totenschläger.

Power Supplies

T-Rex manufactures a line of power supplies for guitar pedals called FuelTank.

FuelTank Classic

Features eight 9V DC outputs (500mA total), one 12V DC isolated output (500mA), and one 12V AC isolated output (500mA). Voltage selector allows operation at 115 or 230 volts.

FuelTank Chameleon

Features six isolated outputs (300mA each), five of which can be used simultaneously. The user can switch between 9V DC, 12V DC, 18V DC and 12V AC output. Voltage selector allows operation at 115 or 230 volts.

FuelTank Junior

Features five 9V DC isolated outputs (120 mA each). The latest version has a voltage selector and allows operation at 115 or 230 volts and comes with a voltage- and a current doubler cable (18V/240mA), which combine two outputs into one.

References
 "Company Info", on company website.
 "a T-Rex story", on company website.
 "T-Rex featured in Young Guitar Magazine, Japan", on company website.
 https://www.louder.com/de/magazin/t-rex-effects-daenische-delikatessen-unter-den-effektpedalen

Footnotes

External links
T-Rex Engineering's Official Site.
A collection of videos showcasing the pedals.

Music equipment manufacturers
Musical instrument manufacturing companies of Denmark
Danish brands
Guitar effects manufacturing companies
Danish companies established in 1996
Companies based in Vejle Municipality